Aponotoreas anthracias is a moth of the family Geometridae. It is endemic to New Zealand.  This species was first described by Edward Meyrick in 1883 under the name Larentia anthracias. Specimens of this species have been collected in the Maungatua ranges, the Remarkables and the Hawkdun Ecological District in Otago.  The host plant of this moth is Dracophyllum.

References

External links

Citizen science observations

Moths of New Zealand
Hydriomenini
Moths described in 1883
Endemic fauna of New Zealand
Taxa named by Edward Meyrick
Endemic moths of New Zealand